The Ford or Landscape with Shepherds is a 1644 oil-on-canvas painting by the French artist Claude Lorrain, now in the Prado Museum in Madrid.

It was recorded in 1746 in the collection of Philip V of Spain in the palacio de La Granja. It was in the palacio de Aranjuez from at least 1794 until at least 1827

References

Bibliography 
  Luna, Juan José (1984). Claudio de Lorena y el ideal clásico de paisaje en el siglo XVII. Madrid: Ministerio de Cultura, Dirección General de Bellas Artes y Archivos. .
  Röthlisberger, Marcel; Cecchi, Doretta (1982). La obra pictórica completa de Claudio de Lorena. Barcelona: Noguer. .
  Sureda, Joan (2001). Summa Pictorica VI. La fastuosidad de lo Barroco. Barcelona: Planeta. .

Landscape paintings
1644 paintings
Paintings by Claude Lorrain
Paintings of the Museo del Prado by French artists
Water in art